"Where Is My Castle" is a single by American country music artist Connie Smith. Released in December 1970, the song reached #11 on the Billboard Hot Country Singles chart. An album of the same name was later issued in early 1971 to go along with the single. Additionally, "Where Is My Castle" peaked at #20 on the Canadian RPM Country Tracks chart.

Chart performance

References

1970 singles
Connie Smith songs
Songs written by Dallas Frazier
Song recordings produced by Bob Ferguson (musician)
1970 songs
RCA Records singles